Porto is a 2016 American drama film directed by Gabe Klinger and written by Larry Gross and Gabe Klinger. The film stars Anton Yelchin, Lucie Lucas, Paulo Calatré, João Monteiro Oliveira and Françoise Lebrun. Executive producer was Jim Jarmusch. The film was released on November 17, 2017, by Kino Lorber.

Cast
Anton Yelchin as Jake Kleeman
Lucie Lucas as Mati Vargnier
Paulo Calatré as João
Françoise Lebrun as Mother
Leonor Brunner as Madeleine
Leonor Cordes as Leonor
Naga as Schmitty

Release
The film premiered at the San Sebastián International Film Festival on September 19, 2016. On March 10, 2017, Kino Lorber acquired distribution rights to the film . The film was released on November 17, 2017, by Kino Lorber.
It has a rating of 52% on Rotten tomatoes, based on 31 reviews, and 48 on Metacritic, based on 11.

References

External links
 
 

2016 films
Portuguese-language films
2010s French-language films
2016 drama films
American drama films
Films set in Portugal
Portuguese drama films
English-language Portuguese films
French drama films
English-language French films
Polish drama films
English-language Polish films
2010s English-language films
2010s American films
2010s French films